Tommy Haas was the defending champion, but could not participate this year due to a shoulder injury.

Andy Murray won the title by defeating David Ferrer 5–7, 6–2, 7–5 in the final.

Seeds
The top four seeds receive a bye into the second round.

Draw

Finals

Top half

Bottom half

Qualifying

Seeds

Qualifiers

Lucky loser

Qualifying draw

First qualifier

Second qualifier

Third qualifier

Fourth qualifier

References
 Main Draw
 Qualifying Draw

Erste Bank Open - Singles
2014 Singles
Erste Bank Open Singles